Djed is a symbol in ancient Egyptian religion.

Djed may also refer to:

Djed of the Bosnian Church 
"Djed", a song by the band Tortoise